Wang Chien-ming (born 4 July 1993) is an international footballer who plays as a defender for Qingdao Hainiu. Born in South Korea, Chien-ming represents the Chinese Taipei national football team.

Club career

Early career
Wang Chien-ming was born in Seogwipo, Jeju, South Korea to a Taiwanese father and Korean mother. While in the fourth grade of elementary school he would join the Jeju United youth system before going to Dankook University to participate in college football. After he graduated he returned to Jeju United, however he did not make any appearances for them and joined fourth tier club Cheongju City before joining Gwangju in the second tier.

Shaanxi Chang'an Athletic
On 28 August 2020 after a series of training sessions Wang would join China League One club Shaanxi Chang'an Athletic.
Made his debut for the North West Wolves on 13 September 2020 in a league match against Jiangxi Liansheng. On 3 June 2021, Wang scored his first league goal in a 2:2 draw against Zhejiang.
Wang played a total of 56 matches and scored 4 goals in all competitions during his time with the Xi'an club.

Qingdao Hainiu
On 2 August 2022 after two years with the Xi'an club, Wang joined fellow China League One club Qingdao Hainiu during the summer transfer window.
Wang made his debut for the Qingdao club on 4 August 2022, in a league match against Shanghai Jiading in a 2-0 victory. He would go on to establish himself as regular within the team that gained promotion to the top tier at the end of the 2022 China League One campaign.

International career
Although born in South Korea, Wang Chien-ming was eligible to play for Chinese Taipei through his grandfather. He would be selected for the squad for the 2019 AFC Asian Cup qualification – Third Round match against Singapore on 27 March 2018, however he could not play because there was still confusion about his grandfather who had a Republic of China passport rather than the newly named and relocated Taiwan passport. He would be eventually allowed to represent Chinese Taipei and would make his debut on 1 June 2018 against India in the 2018 Intercontinental Cup in match that ended in a 5-0 defeat.

Career statistics

Club

Notes

International

References

External links

1993 births
Living people
Sportspeople from Jeju Province
Taiwanese footballers
Chinese Taipei international footballers
South Korean footballers
South Korean people of Taiwanese descent
Association football defenders
Dankook University alumni
Jeju United FC players
Gwangju FC players
Shaanxi Chang'an Athletic F.C. players
K League 1 players
K League 2 players
China League One players
Expatriate footballers in China